Charles Coleman may refer to:

Entertainment
 Charles Coleman (English painter) (1807–1874), English painter
 Charles Caryl Coleman (1840–1928), American painter
 Charles Coleman (actor) (1885–1951), Australian-American actor
 Charles C. Coleman (director) (1900–1972), American film director
 Charles Coleman (music producer) (born 1977), American record producer and songwriter

Other
 Charles Coleman (British Army officer) (1903–1974), British general
 Charles Coleman (American football) (born 1963), American football player
 Charles Coleman (politician), American member of the Wisconsin State Assembly
 Charles Coleman (murderer) (1947–1990), American convicted murderer
 Charles Coleman (engineer) (1926–2005), electronic engineer - video tape recording
 Chase Coleman III (Charles Payson Coleman III, born 1975), American investor